University of the West Indies at Cave Hill is a public research university  in Cave Hill, Barbados. It is one of five general campuses in the University of the West Indies system.

It was the third campus to be established by the UWI System, following the Mona campus in Jamaica and the St. Augustine campus in Trinidad and Tobago. The Cave Hill campus is also the headquarters of the Open Campus, which is responsible for UWI programmes in the non-campus territories. The University of the West Indies, Cave Hill Campus' academic programmes offer diversity at both the undergraduate and graduate level. There are seven faculties with supporting academic departments; various research units and centres; and two graduate institutions. Codrington College, the oldest educational institution in the Caribbean, is affiliated with Cave Hill, while the School of Education works with Erdiston Teachers' Training College to provide pre-service and in-service training to teachers in Barbados and other parts of the Caribbean. Since 2004, the Cave Hill campus is the site of the West Indies Federal Archives Centre.

History 
The university was founded in 1948, on the recommendation of the Asquith Commission on Higher Education in the Colonies, through its sub-committee on the West Indies chaired by Sir James Irvine. The Asquith Commission had been established in 1943 to review the provision of higher education in the British colonies. Initially in a special relationship with the University of London, the then University College of the West Indies (UCWI) was seated at Mona, about five miles from Kingston, Jamaica.

The University College achieved independent university status in 1962.  The St Augustine Campus in Trinidad, formerly the Imperial College of Tropical Agriculture (ICTA), was established in 1960.

Sir Arthur Lewis, then Vice-Chancellor of the independent UWI, wanted to expand the university beyond Jamaica and Trinidad and Tobago to serve the "little eight" - the eastern Caribbean islands. The "little eight" comprised Grenada, Dominica, St. Kitts, and Nevis, Antigua and Barbuda, St. Lucia, St. Vincent and the Grenadines, and Montserrat. These islands, smaller than either Jamaica or Trinidad and Tobago, had been members of the West Indies Federation but upon its dissolution, were isolated and in need of regional support. A proposal was developed and submitted in February 1963 to the University Council for a campus in Barbados. It was approved and was initially housed in a site near the Bridgetown Harbour. The Campus opened just over half a year later with 118 students. It subsequently moved to Cave Hill, its present location, in 1967. Initially, it was called the College of Arts and Sciences  and received significant support from the Government of Barbados in the form of free university education for its citizens.

Enrolment, graduation and research data 
According to the 2015/2016 Cave Hill Campus Annual Report to Council, on 29 November 2016, there were 5,507 students on the Cave Hill Campus. This represented a 9 per cent decline from the previous year, largely due to a change in policy by the Government of Barbados resulting in students having to pay university tuition fees. Previously, Bajan students only had to pay limited charges. The Faculty of Social Studies had the largest enrolment, followed by the Faculty of Sciences and Technology, the Faculty of Law and the Faculty of Medical Sciences and finally the Faculty of Humanities and Education. Graduate studies comprised 703 students.

In the 2015/16 academic year, 1,216 undergraduate degrees were awarded, along with 473 postgraduate credentials (including doctorates, master's degrees and advanced diplomas) for a grand total of 1,689 awards.

During the 2015/16 academic year, BD$268,402.79 was awarded by the Campus to postgraduate students for conference attendance and research. In the same year, BD$316,974 was provided to faculty members for research and attending conferences. Cave Hill faculty members published 11 books, 42 book chapters, 30 technical reports and 137 journal articles during this time.

Campus 

The original, temporary campus, then known as the College of Arts and Science, was located at the Trade Fair site, at the Deep Water Harbour. The permanent campus was established in Cave Hill (from which the campus takes its name), St. Michael, with the foundation stone laid on 26 January 1966. The campus was designed by Captain William Tomlin and consists of a total of 39.7 ha. 17 ha overlooks the city of Bridgetown, while a further 13 ha of adjacent land is situated with a view of the Caribbean Sea.

The campus has two other off-campus sites in progress. One is the Dukes Lands in the parish of St. Thomas. Activities at the Dukes Lands include training in various areas of agro-business, such as producing leather goods and manufacturing chocolate, research and support for entrepreneurial initiatives.

A second is an incubator for digital entrepreneurship in Bridgetown. It occupies the Mutual Building, the former headquarters of Sagicor Financial Corporation, from which UWI leased the building.

Other suggestions for a further satellite campus within Barbados have included moving or establishing a portion back to Bridgetown.

Faculties 
 Culture, Creative & Performing Arts 
 Humanities and Education
 Law
 Medical Sciences
 Science and Technology
 Social Sciences
 Sport

Accreditation 

In 2019, UWI Cave Hill (as a whole) was re-accredited by the Barbados Accreditation Council for the maximum term, ending in 2026.
The three UWI medical schools are accredited together, despite differences in curriculum, and are currently accredited with conditions by the Caribbean Accreditation Authority for Education in Medicine and other Health Professions (CAAM-HP).

Faculty of Culture, Creative and Performing Arts

Departments 
 Department of Cultural Studies
 Department of Creative and Performing Arts (formerly Errol Barrow Centre for Creative Imagination)

Faculty of Humanities and Education

Departments 
 School of Education
 Department of History and Philosophy
 Department of Language, Linguistics & Literature

Specialised units and centres 
 Centre for Caribbean Lexicography
 Centre for Language Learning Centre

Affiliated colleges 
 Codrington College
 Erdiston Teachers' Training College

Faculty of Law

Specialised units and centres 
 Caribbean Law Institute Centre (CLIC), twinned with the Florida State University Caribbean Law Institute

Faculty of Medical Sciences

Specialised units and centres 
 George Alleyne Chronic Disease Research Centre

Faculty of Science and Technology

Departments 
 Department of Biological & Chemical Sciences
 Department of Computer Science, Mathematics and Physics

Specialised units and centres 
 Centre for Resource Management & Environmental Studies (CERMES)

Affiliated centres 
 Caribbean Institute for Meteorology and Hydrology

Faculty of Social Sciences

Departments 
 Department of Economics
 Department of Government, Sociology, Social Work & Psychology
 Department of Management Studies

Academic units and centres 
 Shridath Ramphal Centre - International Trade Law, Policy and Services
 CLR James Cricket Research Centre
 Sagicor Cave Hill School of Business and Management

Affiliated research units and centres 
 Institute for Gender and Development Studies - Nita Barrow Unit
 Sir Arthur Lewis Institute of Social & Economic Studies (SALISES)

Faculty of Sport

Academy of Sport

Student life 

The Cave Hill Academy of Sport, now a unit of the new Faculty of Sport, provides a range of sporting activities for participants, nicknamed the UWI Blackbirds.
There are many clubs and associations at the university, divided into categories such as: cultural, academic, religious and service.
One popular artistic student group is the Cavite Chorale.

Campus principals and pro vice-chancellors 
 Mr Leslie R. B. Robinson, founding principal of the College of Arts and Science
 Sir Sidney Lancelot Martin (1964–1983)
 Sir Woodville Marshall
 Sir Keith Hunte (1983–2002)
 Professor Sir Hilary Beckles (2002–2015), currently UWI vice-chancellor
 Eudine Barriteau (2015–2021)
 Professor R. Clive Landis (2021–present)

Notable alumni 

 Sandra Mason, first and current President of Barbados
 Paula-Mae Weekes, current President of Trinidad and Tobago
 Timothy Harris, current Prime Minister of Saint Kitts and Nevis
 Keith Mitchell, current Prime Minister of Grenada
 Owen Arthur, former Prime Minister of Barbados
 Denzil Douglas, former Prime Minister of Saint Kitts and Nevis
 Freundel Stuart, former Prime Minister of Barbados
 David Thompson, former Prime Minister of Barbados
 Kenny Anthony, former Prime Minister of Saint Lucia
 Tracy Davidson-Celestine, former political leader of the Tobago Council of the People's National Movement and former Trinidad and Tobago Ambassador to Costa Rica
 Marion Vernese Williams, former Governor of the Central Bank of Barbados
 John Holder, former Anglican Archbishop of the West Indies
 Adrian Saunders, President of the Caribbean Court of Justice
 Sir. Derek Walcott, Poet Nobel Laureate
DeLisle Worrell, former Governor of the Central Bank of Barbados
Mia Mottley, current Prime Minister of Barbados

See also 
University of the West Indies
Barbados Community College
Samuel Jackman Prescod Institute of Technology
Codrington College
Erdiston Teachers' Training College

References

External links 

 
 The Cave Hill School of Business
 Satellite view of the Cave Hill campus
 Map of the UWI Cave Hill Campus

1963 establishments in Barbados
Education in Barbados
Educational organisations based in Barbados
Populated places in Barbados
Saint Michael, Barbados
Universities and colleges in Barbados
University of the West Indies